III is the third album from Bad Books, the collaborative project from Kevin Devine and Manchester Orchestra members Andy Hull and Robert McDowell. The album was released in digital format on June 14, 2019 while the physical release took place on June 21, 2019 on Loma Vista Recordings.

The band performed for the first time since 2012 at South by Southwest on March 13, 2019, playing an acoustic poolside set that included songs from III. They later announced a summer headlining tour supporting the new album, including an appearance at Shaky Knees Music Festival.

Track listing

Personnel 
Kevin Devine - lead vocals, guitar, percussion
Andy Hull - lead vocals, guitar, piano	
Robert McDowell - piano, organ, string arrangements

References 

2019 albums
Bad Books albums